If I Ruled the World: Songs for the Jet Set is a 1965 studio album by Tony Bennett, arranged by Don Costa. Bennett dedicated his recording of "Sweet Lorraine" on the album to Nat "King" Cole, who had died a month before the album's release.

Track listing
 "Samba do Avião" ("Song of the Jet") (Antônio Carlos Jobim, Gene Lees) – 3:34
 "Fly Me to the Moon" (Bart Howard) – 4:00
 "How Insensitive" (Vinicius de Moraes, Norman Gimbel, Jobim) – 4:23
 "If I Ruled the World" (Leslie Bricusse, Cyril Ornadel) – 3:00
 "Love Scene" (Marshall Barer, Duke Ellington) – 2:33
 "Take the Moment" (Richard Rodgers, Stephen Sondheim) – 3:59
 "Then Was Then and Now Is Now" (Cy Coleman, Peggy Lee) – 3:05
 "Sweet Lorraine" (Cliff Burwell, Mitchell Parish) – 3:39
 "The Right to Love" (Gene Lees, Lalo Schifrin) – 3:41
 "Watch What Happens" (Jacques Demy, Gimbel, Michel Legrand) – 2:57
 "All My Tomorrows" (Sammy Cahn, Jimmy Van Heusen) – 3:19
 "Two by Two" (Martin Charnin, Rodgers) – 3:25

Personnel

Performance
 Tony Bennett – vocals
 Al Cohn - tenor sax (#1-3, 9)
 Joe Marsala - clarinet (#8)
 Ralph Sharon - piano
 Carlos Lyra - guitar (#1, 3)
 Bobby Hackett - ukulele (#8)
 Hal Gaylor - bass
 William "Billy" Exiner, Elcio Milito (#1 only) - drums
 Don Costa – arranger, conductor

References

1965 albums
Tony Bennett albums
Albums arranged by Don Costa
Columbia Records albums
Albums conducted by Don Costa